Richard Porter may refer to:

Richard Porter (radio), on Heart Kent
Richard Porter (MP) for Midhurst (UK Parliament constituency)
Richard Kalan Porter, Canadian singer/songwriter
Dick Porter, former Major League Baseball outfielder
Ricky Porter, former American football running back
Richard Thomas Porter founding partner in the firm of Aveling and Porter.
Richard Porter, writer on Petrolheads and Sniff Petrol
Richard Porter, namesake of Porterville, Illinois